Schöler, Schoeler may refer to:

 Christian Schoeler (born 1979), a German painter
 Diane Schöler-Rowe (born 1933), an English-German table tennis player
 Eberhard Schöler (born 1940), a German table tennis player
 Gregor Schoeler (born 1944), a Swiss contemporary non-Muslim Islamic scholar
 Hans Schöler, a Czech Ethnic German luger
 Hans Robert Schöler (born 1953), a molecular biologist and stem cell researcher

German-language surnames